Bottero or Bottéro may refer to:

 Angelica Bottero, Italian artist and nun of the seventeenth century
 Jean Bottéro (1914–2007), French historian
 Mónica Bottero (b. 1964), Uruguayan journalist
 Pierre Bottero (1964–2009), French writer
Rita Bottero (Margherita Bottero) (1937–2014), Italian cross-country skier, competitor at the 1956 Winter Olympics

Surnames of Italian origin